In probability theory, a 2-EPT probability density function is a class of probability density functions on the real line. The class contains the density functions of all distributions that have characteristic functions that are strictly proper rational functions (i.e., the degree of the numerator is strictly less than the degree of the denominator).

Definition

On either  or  these probability density functions are exponential-polynomial-trigonometric (EPT) functions.

Any EPT density function on  can be represented as

The parameterization 
is the minimal realization of the 2-EPT function.

Unlike phase-type and matrix geometric distributions, the 2-EPT probability density functions are defined on the whole real line. It has been shown that the class of 2-EPT densities is closed under many operations and using minimal realizations these calculations have been illustrated for the two-sided framework in Sexton and Hanzon. The most involved operation is the convolution of 2-EPT densities using state space techniques. Much of the work centers on the ability to decompose the rational characteristic function into the sum of two rational functions with poles located in either the open left or open right half plane. The variance-gamma distribution density has been shown to be a 2-EPT density under a parameter restriction and the variance gamma process can be implemented to demonstrate the benefits of adopting such an approach for financial modelling purposes. 

It can be shown using Parseval's theorem and an isometry that approximating the discrete time rational transform is equivalent to approximating the 2-EPT density itself in the L-2 Norm sense. The rational approximation software RARL2 is used to approximate the discrete time rational characteristic function of the density.

Applications
Examples of applications  include option pricing, computing the Greeks and risk management calculations. Fitting 2-EPT density functions to empirical data has also been considered.

Notes

External links
2 - Exponential-Polynomial-Trigonometric (2-EPT) Probability Density Functions Website for background and Matlab implementations

Types of probability distributions

ru:Распределение variance-gamma